Food Terminal Incorporated (FTI) is a Filipino government owned and controlled corporation, headquartered at West Bicutan, Taguig, Metro Manila, Republic of the Philippines; focused on food processing and distribution.

The FTI is a major subsidiary agency of the National Food Authority (NFA).

History
It was a priority project of then Philippine President Ferdinand Marcos to revolutionise the agricultural sector of the country, and establish a food consolidation centre.

The company’s major activities include warehousing, food processing, research and quality control, marketing services, and trading.

In April 1979, the Human Settlements Development Corporation took over the ownership and management of the company.  FTI became a major subsidiary agency of the National Food Authority (NFA).

Decline
On 1989, food trading and food processing operations, including live animal slaughtering, were suspended.  Cold storage services were also suspended in 2004 due to technical problems and viability concerns.

There have been several attempts over multiple Philippines presidential administrations to sell off part of the property, including a public auction in 2009, but they all failed. Ayala plans to turn the property into a mixed-use development, now known as Arca South. Proceeds from the sale are pledged to the programmes of the Department of Agriculture and the Department of Agrarian Reform. The remaining  remains in FTI.

Revival
FTI will be revived by the Department of Agriculture (DA), with its reopening in Taguig.  FTI still has a  area available, with  occupied by informal settlers.  The new FTI will feature food processing and cold storage facilities for produce to be sold to various consumer and vendor associations.

According to Agriculture Secretary Emmanuel Piñol, FTI will own logistics equipment to transfer goods from regional food terminals to markets, with a total of six food terminals to be built during President Rodrigo Duterte's term.

FTI aims to be the leading food processing and distribution hub in the Philippines by 2030.

Current developments

Arca South

Arca South is a mixed-use development owned by Ayala Land, Inc. located at East Service Road, South Luzon Expressway, Taguig.

FTI Special Economic Zone
The FTI Special Economic Zone is a special economic zone located in Taguig.  It houses industrial and retail enterprises as well as government offices such as:
Air Liquide
Continental
Dizon Farm
Hi-Las Corporation
Keba
Land Transportation Office (Taguig extension)
PSi Technologies Inc. (extension office)
Team Pacific Corporation
Puregold FTI
SM Hypermarket FTI
Temic
Vishay Philippines Inc.
Sunshine Mall

Other

FTI Corporate Center
The new FTI Corporate Center will house government offices.  It will also be a commercial and office property for lease.

Regional Food Terminals (RFT)
Six regional food terminals will be established.  These terminals are to be constructed in Luzon, Visayas, Mindanao, and Metro Manila.

References

External links
Official website 
Department of Agriculture (Philippines)
National Food Authority (Philippines)

Government-owned and controlled corporations of the Philippines
Food companies